Clarkson Peak is a prominent conical peak,  high, at the head of Robb Glacier, on the spur running west from Mount Miller. It was sighted in January 1958 by the New Zealand Southern Party of the Commonwealth Trans-Antarctic Expedition (1956–58), and named for Mr. T.R. Clarkson, a member of the Ross Sea Committee.

References
 

Mountains of the Ross Dependency
Shackleton Coast